Bidorpitia is a genus of moths belonging to the family Tortricidae.

Species
Bidorpitia arbitralis Razowski & Wojtusiak, 2010
Bidorpitia banosana Razowski & Wojtusiak, 2008
Bidorpitia biforis Razowski & Wojtusiak, 2008
Bidorpitia boliviana Brown, in Brown & Powell, 1991
Bidorpitia ceramica Razowski & Wojtusiak, 2006
Bidorpitia columna Razowski & Wojtusiak, 2008
Bidorpitia cryptica Brown, in Brown & Powell, 1991
Bidorpitia dictyophanes (Meyrick, 1926)
Bidorpitia exanthina (Meyrick, 1931)
Bidorpitia ferruginata Razowski & Pelz, 2007
Bidorpitia gomphifera Razowski & Wojtusiak, 2008
Bidorpitia megasaccula Brown, in Brown & Powell, 1991
Bidorpitia paracolumna Razowski & Wojtusiak, 2008
Bidorpitia poolei Brown, in Brown & Powell, 1991
Bidorpitia unguifera Razowski & Wojtusiak, 2008

See also
List of Tortricidae genera

References

 , 1991, Univ. Calif. Publ. Ent. 111: 71.
 , 2007: Chrysoxena-group of genera from Ecuador (Lepidoptera: Tortricidae). Shilap Revista de Lepidopterologica 35 (137): 33–46. Full article: .
 , 2008: Eight new species of the genera Vulpoxena , Cuproxena and Bidorpitia of the Chrysoxena group of genera from Ecuador. (Lepidoptera: Tortricidae). Genus 19 (1): 113–123. Full article: 
 , 2010: Tortricidae (Lepidoptera) from Peru. Acta Zoologica Cracoviensia 53B (1-2): 73-159. . Full article:  .

External links
tortricidae.com

Euliini
Tortricidae genera